SC Kremikovtsi was a Bulgarian women's basketball club from the Kremikovtsi district in Sofia. It won five national championships between 1989 and 1999 and appeared in the European Cup and the Ronchetti Cup.

Titles 
 Bulgarian Championship
 1989, 1993, 1997, 1998, 1999
 Bulgarian Cup
 1992, 1993

References 

Women's basketball teams in Bulgaria
Sport in Sofia